Jost-Franz Huwyler-Boller (1874 – 1930) was a Swiss architect from Zurich who built several famous hotels.

Career
Jost Franz Huwyler-Boller is best known as the architect of historic Kurhaus Hotel in Bergün, GR. This grand hotel was designed following the Jugendstil style. The hotel was built from 1905 to 1907. It was awarded as the "historical hotel of the year" in 2012 by ICOMOS. He also designed the Cresta Palace Hotel in Celerina (St. Moritz), the Schweizerhof Hotel in Como and the former Hotel Reber au Lac in Locarno.

External References 
 ICOMOS Historical Hotel - Kurhaus Berguen (in German)

References

Swiss architects
1874 births
1930 deaths
People from Zürich
Modernist architects
Art Nouveau architects